Snake language may refer to:

 Snake Language,  a 2006 album by Crawfish of Love, see Gary Duncan
 Kuuk Yak language, an extinct Paman language of Australia
 Parseltongue, a language used to communicate with snakes in the Harry Potter universe
 Shoshoni language of North America; see

See also
 Sake language